Phemonopsis is a genus of longhorn beetles of the subfamily Lamiinae, containing the following species:

 Phemonopsis cylindricus Breuning, 1948
 Phemonopsis grossepunctatus Breuning, 1980

References

Pteropliini